Johan Pater (born 1 January 1981) is a Dutch former professional footballer.

References

1981 births
Living people
Dutch footballers
PSV Eindhoven players
FC Eindhoven players
AGOVV Apeldoorn players
SC Telstar players
Go Ahead Eagles players
FC Volendam players
Association football midfielders